This is the discography of the South Korean singer Lim Young-woong. He has released one studio album, one collaboration extended play (EP), eleven singles as a lead artist, and one promotional single.

Albums

Studio albums

Collaborative albums

Singles

Promotional singles

Soundtrack appearances

Other charted songs

Mr. Trot-related songs

Music videos

Notes

References

Discographies of South Korean artists
K-pop discographies